The Pakistan Cricket Board (PCB) organized a Women's ODI tri-nation in Doha during January 2014 followed by a Women's T20I tri-nation series in the same month. The participating teams were Pakistan, South Africa and Ireland. Both tournaments were played in a round-robin format where each team faced other team twice and followed by a final. All the matches were played at West End Park International Cricket Stadium, Doha.

WODI Series

Squads 

Initially Marina Iqbal was named in Pakistan squad for both ODI and T20I. But later she withdrawn herself.

Points table

League Matches

1st WODI

2nd WODI

3rd WODI

4th WODI

5th WODI

6th WODI

Final

WT20I Series 

The Twenty20 tournament started on 19th January with the final match taking place on 24th January. These matches are also played at Doha.

Squads

Points table

League Matches

1st WT20I

2nd WT20I

3rd WT20I

4th WT20I

5th WT20I

6th WT20I

Final

References

External links 
 50-over Tri-series home at ESPN Cricinfo
 20-over Tri-series home at ESPN Cricinfo

International cricket competitions in 2013–14
Women's Twenty20 cricket international competitions
Women's One Day International cricket competitions

South Africa women's national cricket team tours